District 16 of the Oregon State Senate comprises all of Clatsop and Columbia counties, and parts of Multnomah, Tillamook, and Washington counties. It is currently represented by Democrat Rachel Armitage.

Election results
District boundaries have changed over time, therefore, senators before 2013 may not represent the same constituency as today. From 1993 until 2003, the district covered parts of the Salem metropolitan area, and from 2003 until 2013 it covered a slightly different area in northwest Oregon.

References

16
Clatsop County, Oregon
Columbia County, Oregon
Multnomah County, Oregon
Tillamook County, Oregon
Washington County, Oregon